

Results

References

Men's synchronized 10 metre platform